Jeanne Marie Golay (born April 16, 1962) is an American former road bicycle racing professional from Coral Gables, Florida.  She won the 1992, 1994 and 1995 United States National Road Race Championships, and the 1992 world team time-trial championship, and competed in the 1992 Barcelona Olympics and 1996 Atlanta Olympics. In 2008, in Davis California, she was inducted into the United States Bicycling Hall of Fame in the category Modern Road & Track Competitor.

In Glenwood Springs, Colorado, a training and exercise trail formerly known as Red Mountain Trail has been renamed the Jeanne Golay Trail.

Major results 

1988
 1st place in USA National Rankings, USA.
1989
 1st place in  National Time Trial Championships – Individual (ITT), USA.
 1990
 1st place in  National Time Trial Championships – Team (TTT), USA.
Tested positive for steroids in 1990, pulled from TTT Team
 1991
 1st place in Tour of the Alpine Banks, USA.
 1st place in  National Time Trial Championships – Team (TTT), USA.
 1st place in Pan American Games (TTT), Cuba.
 1st place in Pan American Games (RR), Cuba.
 1st place in Brick Criterium, USA
1992
 1st place in Westfriese Tweedaagse, Holland.
 1st place in Brecht, Belgium.
 1st place in Omloop Van Het Molenheike, Holland.
 1st place in  National Time Trial Championships – Individual (ITT), USA.
 1st place in  National Time Trial Championships – Team (TTT), USA.
 1st place in  National Road Championships, USA.
 1st place in  World Time Trial Championships – Team (TTT), Spain.
 USCF Athlete of the Year Award.
 1993
 1st place in Mike Nields Memorial, USA.
 1st place in International Idaho Women's Challenge, USA.
 1st place in Athens Zanesville, USA.
 1994
 1st place in Redlands Bicycle Classic, USA.
 1st place in Dole Cycling Classic, USA.
 1st place in Electricity City Challenge, USA.
 1st place in Tour of Somerville, USA.
 1st place in  National Road Championships, USA.
 1st place in Korbel Champagne Cup Series, USA.
 1st place in USA National Rankings.
 3rd place in UCI Road World Championships – Women's Road Race
 1995
 1st place in Pan American Games, (RR), Argentina.
 1st place in Sequoia Cycling Classic, USA.
 1st place in  National Road Championships, USA.
 1st place in Frigidaire Cycling Classic, USA.
 1st place in Colorado Cycling Classic, USA.
 1st place in Fresca Cup, USA.
 1st place in USA National Rankings.
1996
 1st place in Valley of the Sun, USA.
 1st place in  National Criterium Championships, USA.

References

External links
 

1962 births
Living people
American female cyclists
Cyclists at the 1995 Pan American Games
UCI Road World Champions (women)
American cycling road race champions
Olympic cyclists of the United States
Cyclists at the 1991 Pan American Games
Cyclists at the 1992 Summer Olympics
Cyclists at the 1996 Summer Olympics
Sportspeople from Coral Gables, Florida
University of Florida alumni
Pan American Games medalists in cycling
Pan American Games gold medalists for the United States
Medalists at the 1991 Pan American Games
Medalists at the 1995 Pan American Games
21st-century American women
Cyclists from Florida